AIDGAP is an acronym for Aid to Identification in Difficult Groups of Animals and Plants.

The AIDGAP series is a set of books published by the Field Studies Council. They are intended to enable students and interested non-specialists to identify groups of taxa in Britain which are not covered by standard field guides. In general, they are less demanding in level than the Synopses of the British Fauna.

All AIDGAP guides are initially produced as test versions, which are circulated widely to students, teaching staff and environmental professionals, with the feedback incorporated into the final published versions. In many cases the AIDGAP volume is the only non-technical work covering the group of taxa in question.

History of the series 

The Field Studies Council recognised the widespread need for identification guides soon after its inception, and has since established a long tradition of publishing such material. Many of these were written by teaching staff writing their own keys to fill obvious gaps in the available literature (see for example A key to the land snails of the Flatford area, Suffolk (1959)). However, it became increasingly apparent that a change in approach was needed. Too few guides were available which were usable by those with little previous experience. Many groups of plants and animals appeared to be neglected.

The FSC initiated the AIDGAP project in 1976, with input from an advisory panel which included a range of organisations such as the Linnean Society, teachers in secondary education and professional illustrators. The two main objectives adopted by the panel were first to identify those groups of organisms regarded as 'difficult' due to a lack of a suitable key, and second to investigate ways of alleviating the difficulties of identification for each group. The panel also decided to incorporate a 'testing' stage during which the identification guides could be revised and improved.

In practice today, AIDGAP guides are produced as 'test versions', which are then circulated to at least 100 volunteer 'testers', drawn from a wide range of backgrounds. Test versions are available for free download from the AIDGAP web pages. Feedback from the testers is passed anonymously to the author, then used to inform the production of the finished AIDGAP guide.

Titles in the AIDGAP series

A large number of guides have been published in the last thirty years. A list of the works in the series is as follows (see link below for a list of the guides still in print):

AIDGAP guides (books)
 Price & Bersweden (2013) Winter Trees: a photographic guide to common trees and shrubs
 Hubble (2012) Seed beetles
 Sherlock (2012) Earthworms
 Redfern & Shirley (2011) British plant galls (2nd edition)
 Macadam & Bennett (2010) A pictorial guide to British Ephemeroptera
 Barber (2009) Key to the identification of British centipedes
 Barnard & Ross (2008) Guide to the adult caddisflies or sedge flies (Trichoptera)
 Cameron & Riley (2008) Land Snails in the British Isles (2nd edition)
 Pryce, Macadam & Brooks (2007) Guide to the British Stonefly (Plecoptera) families: adults and larvae
 Merryweather & Hill (2007) The fern guide (3rd edition)
 Hopkin (2007) A key to the Springtails (Collembola) of Britain and Ireland
 Wallace (2006) Simple key to caddis larvae
 Hayward (2005) A new key to wild flowers
 Killeen, Aldridge & Oliver (2004) Freshwater Bivalves of Britain and Ireland
 Redfern, Shirley & Bloxham (2002) British Plant Galls: identification of galls on plants and fungi
 Unwin (2001) A key to families of British bugs (Insecta, Hemiptera)
 Kelly (2000) Identification of common benthic diatoms in rivers
 May & Panter (2000) A guide to the identification of deciduous broad-leaved trees and shrubs in winter
 Plant (1997) A key to the adults of British lacewings and their allies (Neuroptera, Megaloptera, Raphidiptera and Mecoptera) 	
 Wheeler (1997) A field key to the freshwater fishes and lampreys of the British Isles
 Crothers (1997) A key to the major groups of British marine invertebrates
 Wheeler (1994) Field Key to the Shore Fishes of the British Isles
 Hopkin (1991) A key to the woodlice of Britain and Ireland
 Vas (1991) A field guide to the Sharks of British Coastal Waters (freely downloadable pdf from )
 Skidmore (1991) Insects of the British cow-dung community
 Wright (1990) British Sawflies (Hymenoptera: Symphyta): a key to adults of the genera occurring in Britain
 Savage (1990) A key to the adults of British Lesser Water Boatmen (Corixidae) (freely downloadable pdf from 
 Jones-Walters (1989) Keys to families of British spiders
 Trudgil (1989) Soil types: a field identification guide
 Friday (1988) A key to the adults of British Water Beetles (freely downloadable pdf from )
 Haslam et al. (1987) British water plants (revised edition)
 Tilling (1987) A key to the major groups of terrestrial invertebrates
 Hiscock (1986) A field guide to the British Red Seaweeds (Rhodophyta)
 King (1986) Sea Spiders. A revised key to the adults of littoral Pycnogonida in the British Isles
 Croft (1986) A key to the major groups of British freshwater invertebrates
 Willmer (1985) Bees, Ants and Wasps - the British Aculeates
 Unwin (1984) A key to the families of British Coleoptera (beetles) and Strepsiptera
 Crothers & Crothers (1983) A key to the crabs and crab-like animals of British inshore waters (revised edition, 1988)
 Unwin (1981) Key to the families of British Diptera (freely downloadable pdf from )
 Sykes (1981) An illustrated guide to the diatoms of British coastal plankton (freely downloadable pdf from )
 Hiscock (1979) A field key to the British Brown Seaweeds

Identification guides (fold-out laminated charts)
 Shaw & Dallimore (2013) Springtails families

AIDGAP Tested Field Guides (Polyclave punched-card keys)
 R.J. Pankhurst & J.M. Allinson (1985) BRITISH GRASSES a punched-card key to grasses in the vegetative state

References

External links
 Full list of AIDGAP guides in print

Wild animals identification
Biological literature
Taxonomy (biology)